Jessica Ryde (born 18 May 1994) is a Swedish handball player for Herning-Ikast Håndbold and the Swedish national team.

She represented Sweden at the 2020 European Women's Handball Championship.

References

External links

1994 births
Living people
Sportspeople from Lund
Swedish female handball players
Expatriate handball players
Swedish expatriate sportspeople in Denmark
FCM Håndbold players
Lugi HF players
Handball players at the 2020 Summer Olympics
Olympic handball players of Sweden
21st-century Swedish women